Miss California USA is the beauty pageant that selects the representative for the state of California in the Miss USA pageant, and the name of the title held by that winner. The pageant is directed by Crown Diva Productions.

California's most successful placements were in 1959, 1966, 1975, 1983, 1992, and 2011, when Terry Huntingdon, Maria Remenyi, Summer Bartholomew, Julie Hayek, Shannon Marketic, and Alyssa Campanella, respectively, were crowned Miss USA. 

The current Miss California USA is Tiffany Johnson of Lancaster, California, who is crowned on June 5, 2022 at the Hyatt Regency Orange County. Johnson represented California for the title of Miss USA 2022, she placed at the Top 16.

History
The Miss California USA Pageant was produced by Carolee Munger. Prior to Ms. Munger, Guyrex Productions held the franchise for a number of years and produced successful televised pageants with over 100 participants. Before Guyrex, the pageant was produced by Dr. Leanord Stallcup, who took over the directorship after Faye Smith successfully led the way through the 1970s and 1980s. Also was produced by Top 10 Productions, Inc. San Diego-based. Top 10 was led by Pam Wilson and Alex Kuty, who have been involved in pageant and fashion production for many years.  Top 10 took over for K2 Productions in 2013. K2 had a number of controversies but during its 9 years producing the pageant, it managed to be the top placing state at Miss USA, growing the entry numbers to the largest state pageant in the history of Miss USA and doing the first live television airing in over 10 years. In the beginning, K2 Productions was directed by former Miss Teen USA 1995, Keylee Sue Sanders, and Keith Lewis. K2 Productions was later directed by Lewis and briefly co-produced by Miss USA 1995, Shanna Moakler. In October 2021, Kristen Bradford of Crown Diva Productions took over the directorship for California pageants.

In 2009 Carrie Prejean was forced to resign after placing 1st runner-up at Miss USA 2009 after a controversy developed regarding the answer she gave to her final interview question at the national pageant.  Pageant organisers claimed she was fired due to contractual violations.

California has produced a Miss USA every decade (except the 2000s) and is ranked second highest among states in terms of placements, after Texas.

Shauna Gambill, who won the national Miss Teen USA crown in 1994, is the only Miss California USA who has previously held the Miss California Teen USA title. As Miss California USA in 1998, Gambill placed 1st Runner-Up to Shawnae Jebbia of Massachusetts. Three Miss California USA titleholders have also competed in the Miss America pageant while two were former winners of the Miss Teenage California Scholarship Pageant.

Gallery of titleholders

Results summary
Miss USAs: Terry Huntingdon (1959), Maria Remenyi (1966), Summer Bartholomew (1975), Julie Hayek (1983), Shannon Marketic (1992), Alyssa Campanella (2011)
1st Runners-Up: Pamela Stettler (1961), Susan Bradley (1967), Diana Magaña (1988), Shauna Gambill (1998), Brittany Hogan (2005), Tamiko Nash (2006), Carrie Prejean (2009)
2nd Runners-Up: Kim Hobson (1972), Diane Schock (1991), Angelique Breaux (1999)
3rd Runners-Up: Donna Schurr (1955), Marilyn Tindall (1962), Gayle Gorrell (1974), Pamela Gergley (1977), Cynthia Kerby (1981), Meagan Tandy (2007)
4th Runners-Up: Francine Herack (1963), Troas Hayes (1969), Kelly Parsons (1986)
Top 5: Nadia Mejía (2016)
Top 10/12: Karin Morrell (1971), Carol Herrema (1973), Joni Pennock (1976), Donna Adrain (1978), Linda Fogarty (1979), Christina Faust (1989), Jane Olvera (1993), Tarah Peters (2002), Nicole Johnson (2010), Cassandra Kunze (2014), India Williams (2017), Kelley Johnson (2018), Allyshia Gupta (2020)
Top 15/20: Marcella Roulette (1953), Sandra Constance (1954), Peggy Jacobson (1957), Donna Brooks (1958), Teri Janssen (1960), Jeanne Venables (1964), Kathryn Hage (1965), Suzanne Fromm (1968), Linda Hall (1970), Raquel Beezley (2008), Mabelynn Capeluj (2013), Tiffany Johnson (2022)

California holds a record of 51 placements at Miss USA, second overall behind Texas and ahead of New York and South Carolina.

Awards
Miss Congeniality: Jeanne Venables (1964), Cynthia Kerby (1981), Lori Dickerson (1987)
Miss Photogenic: Maria Remenyi (1966), Cynthia Kerby (1981), Shannon Marketic (1992), Cassandra Kunze (2014)
Best State Costume: Suzanne Fromm (1968)

Winners 

Color key

Notes

References

External links

Official Miss California USA website

California
California culture
Women in California
1952 establishments in California
Recurring events established in 1952
Annual events in California